is a tactical role-playing game for the Game Boy Advance. It is the second Super Robot Taisen game that was officially released in North America.

The story selection system of Super Robot Taisen: Original Generation has been removed, replacing it with a branching storyline during certain intervals of the game. Original Generation 2 primarily focuses on one of the two selectable protagonists from the first game. In addition, a total of four new series (three of them past Super Robot Wars games, while one is a manga) appear, adding new characters, mechs, major events from the respective stories of the series and some original creations for this game itself. Coupled along with a redesigned user interface and longer battle animations, Original Generation 2 boasts an even greater amount of gameplay and background to the Original Generation universe.

On June 27, 2007 Super Robot Wars: Original Generations, an enhanced remake of both Original Generation games, was released in Japan for the PlayStation 2.

Storyline

It has been six months since the end of the Divine Crusaders War and the L5 Campaign. Seeing a greater need to defend the Earth from future extraterrestrial invaders, the Earth Federation Army begins to mass-produce its line of Personal Troopers, as well as introducing new mechs to combat alien threats to humanity, after the Tokyo Manifest announcement. However, remnants of the Divine Crusaders are still at large, and continue to oppose the Federation. Meanwhile, behind the shadows, mysterious beings are at work, eagerly awaiting their chance to strike and subjugate humanity, or perhaps destroy it, as even greater forces, more powerful and menacing than the Aerogaters, begin to slowly appear...

Series included in Super Robot Taisen: Original Generation 2

Banpresto Originals (Not a TV or movie series)
Shin Super Robot Wars
Super Robot Wars Gaiden: Masō Kishin – The Lord Of Elemental
Chokijin RyuKoOh Denki (超機人 龍虎王伝奇) (New)
3rd Super Robot Wars (New)
Super Robot Wars F
Super Robot Wars F Final
Super Robot Wars Alpha
Super Robot Wars Alpha Gaiden 
2nd Super Robot Wars Alpha (New)
Super Robot Wars Compact 2
Super Robot Wars Impact
Super Hero Operations
Hero Senki: Project Olympus
Super Robot Wars A (New)

External links
 Official site
Super Robot Taisen: Original Generation 2 at GameSpot
Super Robot Taisen: Original Generation 2 IGN

2005 video games
Atlus games
Banpresto games
Game Boy Advance games
Game Boy Advance-only games
Super Robot Wars
Tactical role-playing video games
Video games developed in Japan
505 Games games
Single-player video games